Moor Park is a private residential estate in the Three Rivers District of Hertfordshire, England.

History

It takes its name from Moor Park, a country house which was originally built in 1678–9 for James, Duke of Monmouth, and was reconstructed in the Palladian style circa 1720 by Giacomo Leoni. It is built on what used to be an area of Ruislip Moor, which is where the name Moor Park originates. The house and grounds are now occupied by Moor Park Golf Club.

Moor Park was located in the ancient parish of Rickmansworth, Hertfordshire, on the boundary with the parish of Ruislip, Middlesex.

Geography
The area borders Northwood in Greater London to the south. The majority of the area lies in the Northwood post town and the HA6 postcode district. The surrounding neighbourhood consists mostly of upscale houses, some dating back to the original 1930s developments. Moor Park has large Jewish, Hindu and Sikh communities, and many homeowners commute to London via Moor Park tube station on the Metropolitan line of the London Underground.

References

External links

http://www.moorpark1958.co.uk - Private Estate Management Company website
http://www.timesonline.co.uk/article/0,,2087-2426773.html - 2006 Times article on influx of wealthy Asian families to the neighbourhood

Three Rivers District
Villages in Hertfordshire